Enrique Flores (born 23 November 1968) is a Puerto Rican boxer. He competed in the men's light heavyweight event at the 1996 Summer Olympics.

References

1968 births
Living people
Puerto Rican male boxers
Olympic boxers of Puerto Rico
Boxers at the 1996 Summer Olympics
Place of birth missing (living people)
Light-heavyweight boxers